This is a list of places on the Victorian Heritage Register in the Shire of Mansfield in Victoria, Australia. The Victorian Heritage Register is maintained by the Heritage Council of Victoria.

The Victorian Heritage Register, as of 2021, lists the following eight state-registered places within the Shire of Mansfield:

References 

Mansfield
+
+